Ademar José Ribeiro (18 February 1940 — 12 April 1992), commonly known as Dé, was a Brazilian football player who played as a left back. He played in the NASL.

Career statistics

Club

Notes

Honours
Palmeiras
Torneio Roberto Gomes Pedrosa: 1969

References

1940 births
1992 deaths
Footballers from São Paulo (state)
Brazilian footballers
Brazilian expatriate footballers
Association football defenders
Associação Atlética Portuguesa (Santos) players
São Paulo FC players
Sociedade Esportiva Palmeiras players
Esporte Clube Noroeste players
New York Cosmos players
North American Soccer League (1968–1984) players
Expatriate soccer players in the United States
Brazilian expatriate sportspeople in the United States